Dolichoderus tridentanodus is a species of ant in the genus Dolichoderus. Described by Ortega-De Santiago and Vásquez-Bolaños in 2012, the species is endemic to Mexico.

References

Dolichoderus
Hymenoptera of North America
Insects described in 2012